James Wright (25 March 1874 – 20 August 1961) was an English cricketer who played first-class cricket for  Derbyshire in 1898 and 1905.

Wright was born at Newbold, Leicestershire, the son of Thomas Wright, a coal miner and his wife Elizabeth. In 1881 they were living at Castle Gresley, Derbyshire. Wright made his debut for Derbyshire against  Lancashire in the 1898 season when he scored 2 and 1. However in the next match, a Derbyshire victory over Hampshire, he made 53 not out. He played a total of five matches in the 1898 season. He played one more game for the club in the 1905 season.

Wright was a right-hand batsman and played ten innings in six first-class matches with an average of 10.33 and a top score of 53 not out. He bowled nine overs but took no wickets. He was also an occasional wicket-keeper.

Wright died at Sheffield, Yorkshire at the age of 87.

References

1874 births
1961 deaths
Derbyshire cricketers
English cricketers